Heading South is a 2005 French-Canadian-Belgian drama film directed by Laurent Cantet and based on three short stories by Dany Laferrière. It depicts the experiences of three middle-aged white women in the late 1970s, travelling to Haiti for the purposes of sexual tourism with young men. Their adventures (as seen in their eyes) are juxtaposed with class issues and the deteriorating political climate of Haiti at the time of Jean-Claude “Baby Doc” Duvalier. The women demonstrate different attitudes to the complex situation.

Plot
Ellen (Charlotte Rampling), is a professor of French literature at Wellesley College in Boston who has spent six summers at a Haitian resort where local young men and teenagers providing sexual companionship are easy to find. Among other guests, Brenda (Karen Young), a stay-at-home wife from Savannah, Georgia, and Sue (Louise Portal), a warehouse manager from Montreal, feel lonely and ignored by middle-aged men back at home. They travelled to Haiti to enjoy a holiday of sun, surf, and sex with attractive teenagers to whom they are financially generous; complicating their friendship is the fact that Ellen and Brenda both live for the attention of Legba (Ménothy César). It is only after an episode of violence disrupts their vacation that their eyes are finally opened to the callousness of their hedonistic actions, the suffering of the Haitian people and the political climate.

Cast
 Charlotte Rampling as Ellen
 Karen Young as Brenda
 Louise Portal as Sue
 Ménothy César as Legba
 Lys Ambroise as Albert
 Jackenson Pierre Olmo Diaz as Eddy
 Wilfried Paul as Neptune
 Michelet Cassis as Charlie
 Pierre-Jean Robert as Chico
 Jean Delinze Salomon as Jérémy
 Kettline Amy as Denise
 Daphné Destin as Lossita
 Guiteau Nestant as Frank
 Michelet Ulysse as Bob

Awards and nominations
Nominated, Golden Lion, 2005 Venice Film Festival
Won, Marcello Mastrioanni Award, 2005 Venice Film Festival
Won, CinemAvvenire (Cinema For Peace) Award, 2005 Venice Film Festival

See also
Female sex tourism
Sanky-panky

References

External links
 
 
 

2005 drama films
2005 films
2000s English-language films
Films based on short fiction
Films directed by Laurent Cantet
French drama films
Canadian drama films
2000s French-language films
Films about prostitution
Films set in Haiti
Prostitution in Haiti
2005 multilingual films
2000s Canadian films
2000s French films